Hamad Al-Balochi (Arabic:حمد البلوشي) (born 15 July 1995) is an Emirati footballer. He currently plays as a midfielder for Ajman.

References

External links
 

Emirati footballers
1995 births
Living people
Al Ahli Club (Dubai) players
Al-Wasl F.C. players
Ajman Club players
UAE Pro League players
Association football midfielders
Emirati people of Baloch descent